Côte-des-Neiges station is a Montreal Metro station in Montreal, Quebec, Canada. It is operated by the Société de transport de Montréal (STM) and serves the Blue Line. It is located in the Côte-des-Neiges area of the borough of Côte-des-Neiges–Notre-Dame-de-Grâce. It opened in 1988.

Overview  
It is a normal side platform station built in tunnel. A ticket hall, also in tunnel, diverges to two entrances, one on each side of Ch. de la Côte-des-Neiges. The western entrance is housed in an imposing building containing a stained glass window by Claude Bettinger, while the eastern one is integrated into another building and includes a suite of sculptures by Bernard Chaudron. A second stained-glass mural by Bettinger is found in the transept leading to the platforms.

Origin of name
Côte-des-Neiges station takes its name from the road on which it lies: Côte-des-Neiges Road.

Côte-des-Neiges Road takes its name from the settlement originally on this location, the Village of Côte-des-Neiges, which was created in 1862, and annexed by Montreal in two parts in 1908 and 1910.

The name for the area, Côte de Notre-Dame des Neiges (Our Lady of the Snows Hill), dates from the early 18th century. The name lives on in the church and the school in the centre of the former village.

Connecting bus routes

Nearby points of interest

 St. Mary's Hospital
 Maison de la culture Côte-des-Neiges
 Centre communautaire de la Côte-des-Neiges
 École Notre-Dame-des-Neiges
 Église Notre-Dame-des-Neiges
 Collège Notre-Dame du Sacré-Coeur
 Saint Joseph's Oratory

 Notre Dame des Neiges Cemetery
 Université de Montréal (Jean-Brillant building)
 École des hautes études commerciales (HEC) (Decelles building)
 Collège Jean-de-Brébeuf
 Hôpital Sainte-Justine
 Jewish General Hospital

References

External links

 Côte-des-Neiges station information on STM website
 Montreal by Metro, metrodemontreal.com
 2011 STM System Map
 Metro Map

Blue Line (Montreal Metro)
Côte-des-Neiges–Notre-Dame-de-Grâce
Railway stations in Canada opened in 1988